Brusnik is a village in the Bitola Municipality of North Macedonia.

Demographics 

According to the statistics of Geographers Dimitri Mishev and D. M. Brancoff, the town had a total Christian population of 944 in 1905,  consisting of 488 Patriarchist Bulgarians and 456 Exarchist Bulgarians. It also had 2 schools, 1 Bulgarian and 1 Greek.

According to the 2002 census, total population is 241.

Notable people
Tale Ognenovski - clarinetist and composer

References

Villages in Bitola Municipality